The Puerto Rican Cycling Federation (in Spanish: Federación de Ciclismo de Puerto Rico) is the national governing body of cycle racing in 

is a member of the UCI and COPACI.

Puerto Rican Cyclists 
Stats.

References

External links
 Puerto Rican Cycling Federation official website

Cycle racing organizations
Cycle racing in Puerto Rico
Sports governing bodies in Puerto Rico